The  or 207–900 series (207系900番台) was a commuter electric multiple unit (EMU) train type introduced in 1986 by Japanese National Railways (JNR) and operated by East Japan Railway Company (JR East) on through services between the Joban Line and Tokyo Metro Chiyoda Line. Only one 10-car set was built, which was withdrawn in December 2009.

Design
Based on the earlier 205 series design, the 207-900 series was a prototype built as the first VVVF-controlled EMU operated by JNR. The 207 series built later by JR West bears no relation to this train.

The train used adjustable voltage/adjustable frequency (AVAF) inverters and induction motors using gate turn-off thyristor (GTO) components.

Formation
The sole 10-car set, numbered "71", was formed as follows, with car 1 at the Yoyogi-Uehara end and car 10 at the Toride end.

Cars 3, 6, and 9 were each fitted with one PS21 lozenge-type pantograph.

Interior

History
The train was delivered to Matsudo Depot in November 1986.

It was withdrawn from service in 2009 following the introduction of new E233-2000 series EMUs, and a final "Sayonara" service was run on 5 December 2009. The train was transferred to Nagano on 5 January 2010 for scrapping.

References

External links

Electric multiple units of Japan
East Japan Railway Company
Jōban Line
Train-related introductions in 1986
1500 V DC multiple units of Japan
Kawasaki multiple units
Tokyu Car multiple units